Laura María Garro Sánchez is a Costa Rican educator and a current deputy from Heredia in the Legislative Assembly.

Education
Garro studied business at the National University of Costa Rica. She earned a Master's in business administration from the Autonomous University of Central America.

Business career

Garro worked for 25 years in public banking and finance.

Political career
Garro is a member of the Citizens' Action Party (PAC for its Spanish initials). She has been a provincial secretary, cantonal president, and party congressional participant.

While running for mayor of Puntarenas in 2006 for PAC, Garro said that she wanted to improve tourist infrastructure in Puntarenas. She also wanted to create better opportunities for citizens. She lost the election.

Garro was elected deputy to the Legislative Assembly in 2014.  At the time of her election to deputy, Garro was 62 years old. She will serve alongside Henry Mora Jiménez, another PAC member also from Heredia.

She became second pro-secretary of the Legislative Assembly on 1 May 2014.

References

Living people
Members of the Legislative Assembly of Costa Rica
Citizens' Action Party (Costa Rica) politicians
Workers' rights activists
People from Puntarenas Province
People from Puntarenas
Costa Rican businesspeople
Year of birth missing (living people)
21st-century Costa Rican women politicians
21st-century Costa Rican politicians
21st-century businesswomen